St Bridget's Church in Bridestowe, Devon, is a parish church in the Church of England and one of the central buildings in the rural area on the northwestern edge of Dartmoor. It is a Grade II* listed building of medieval construction with restorations made in the 19th century.

Building
The church is mostly 13th and 15th century, with a west tower and some fragments of Norman work as well as Early English and Perpendicular styles. It is dedicated to the Irish Saint Bride or Bridget, who is depicted in one of the stained glass windows, and from whom the name of the surrounding village is derived. The church's distinctive gateway is described in White's Directories as "a fine Norman arch supposed to be the remains of the original church". Restorations were carried out in circa 1820, 1866, and 1890.

Memorials
On the north wall of the chancel is a 1665 memorial of 1665 to Lady Honor Fortescue Calmady, wife of Sir Shilston Calmady and mother of Josias Calmady. The churchyard contains the grave of Lieutenant Colonel Thomas Wollocombe (1814).

Current day
Regular services are only held on Sunday mornings. A local flower festival is periodically held at the church.

References

External links 
 St Bridget's Church, Bridestowe website

Grade II* listed churches in Devon
Bridestowe
Diocese of Exeter
15th-century church buildings in England
Borough of West Devon